Allison Liddi-Brown is an American television director and producer.

Liddi-Brown received her B.A. in Drama and her M.F.A. in Directing from the University of California, Irvine, where she studied under Professor Keith Fowler. She made her television directorial debut on the first season of the Nickelodeon series, The Secret World of Alex Mack. She then went on to direct episodes for a number of notable television series namely, The Mystery Files of Shelby Woo, Xena: Warrior Princess, Beverly Hills, 90210, Star Trek: Voyager, Even Stevens, CSI: Crime Scene Investigation, CSI: Miami, CSI: NY, Chuck, Grey's Anatomy, Friday Night Lights and Gossip Girl among other series.

In 2010, Brown won the Directors Guild of America award for Outstanding Directorial Achievement in a Children's Program for directing the Disney Channel Original Movie Princess Protection Program starring Selena Gomez and Demi Lovato.

Televisionography

Awards and nominations

References

External links

American television directors
American women television directors
Living people
Place of birth missing (living people)
Year of birth missing (living people)
Directors Guild of America Award winners
University of California, Irvine alumni